Antonio Helio de Castro Neto is a Brazilian-born physicist. He is the founder and director of the Centre for Advanced 2D Materials (previously known as the Graphene Research Centre) at the National University of Singapore. He is a condensed matter theorist known for his work in the theory of metals, magnets, superconductors, graphene and two-dimensional materials. He is a distinguished professor in the Departments of Materials Science Engineering, and physics and professor at the Department of Electrical and Computer Engineering. He was elected as a fellow of the American Physical Society in 2003. In 2011 he was elected as a fellow of the American Association for the Advancement of Science.

Education and career 
In 1984, Castro Neto attended the State University of Campinas (UNICAMP), where he started his studies in particle physics before moving to condensed matter physics.  In Campinas, he completed his undergraduate and Master of Science degree in physics under Amir O. Caldeira. In 1991, he moved to the United States where he obtained his PhD degree at the University of Illinois at Urbana-Champaign under the supervision of Eduardo Fradkin. His PhD thesis dealt with the understanding and description of the lowest energy excitations of Fermi liquids.

After graduation, in 1994, he moved to the United States to join the Institute for Theoretical Physics (currently, Kavli Institute for Theoretical Physics) at the University of California, Santa Barbara where he studied the electronic properties of nanomaterials and nanostructures under Matthew Fisher. In 1995, Raymond Orbach, at that time the Chancellor of the University of California, Riverside, recruited him as an assistant professor. At Riverside, Castro Neto wrote fundamental papers on the theory of disordered magnetic metallic alloys. In 2000, Castro Neto moved to Boston University as a professor of physics. In Boston, Castro Neto was one of the first theorists to look at the electronic properties of graphene that had been isolated by Andre Geim, Kostya Novoselov, and their colleagues at University of Manchester, and communicated in a paper published in the journal Science in October, 2004.

While in Boston, Castro Neto and collaborators explored the unusual properties of the electronic excitations in graphene in terms of massless Dirac electrons and predicted the anomalous quantum Hall effect. Their original work, submitted in May 2005, was rejected. A few months later, Geim and collaborators published a paper in Nature confirming their experimental prediction. A long version of the original work was only published almost one year later in Physical Review B

Castro Neto continued to publish on theoretical aspects of graphene and predicted several other phenomena that were eventually observed experimentally, such as the effect of vacancies in the electronic properties in graphene; the electronic properties of bilayer graphene; superconductivity in graphene; twistronics in graphene; Coulomb blockade in graphene mesoscopic structures; atomic collapse in charge impurities in graphene; localized magnetic states in graphene; gap opening in biased bilayer graphene; strain engineering in graphene; impurity induced spin-orbit effect in graphene, among others. In 2009, Castro Neto published one of the most cited reviews of all time in Reviews of Modern Physics. As a result, in 2010, Castro Neto was invited, and accepted, to become the Editor of the Colloquia section of RMP. In 2016, Thomson Reuters recognized Castro Neto as among the top 1% of researchers for the most cited documents in the field of physics. He reached the same recognition by Clarivate Analytics from 2017 to 2019. His work has been cited more than 51,102 times, and he has an h-index of 90. Due to his contributions to the field of graphene and 2D materials Castro Neto has been called the "godfather of graphene".

In 2008, Castro Neto was recruited to create the first graphene research center in the world at the National University of Singapore. The Graphene Research Centre (GRC) was created in 2010 with facilities for the synthesis, characterization, and device fabrication of graphene devices. In 2014, GRC was expanded by a grant of the National Research Foundation of Singapore to explore other 2D materials beyond graphene and their heterostructures with the creation of the Centre for Advanced 2D Materials.

Castro Neto has also spoken out against the use of fake graphene in industrial applications and called for standardization in graphene production and testing procedures. Castro Neto has studied the properties of graphene in suborbital environments that are relevant for applications in space missions.

Castro Neto has started 4 companies in Singapore: 2D Materials; MADE Advanced Materials; PHASE Events; and Graphene Watts.

References 

Living people
Grainger College of Engineering alumni
20th-century Brazilian physicists
21st-century Brazilian physicists
People from Paranaguá
1964 births
Fellows of the American Association for the Advancement of Science
Fellows of the American Physical Society
Academic staff of the National University of Singapore
Brazilian expatriate academics in the United States
Brazilian expatriates in Singapore
State University of Campinas alumni
Boston University faculty
Brazilian expatriates in the United States
University of California, Riverside faculty